, (24 July 1963) is a 1980s era Japanese pop idol, singer-songwriter, and composer.

Career

Naoko was a regular on Kōhaku Uta Gassen, an annual television program showcasing the country's most popular entertainers.

One of her representative singles is 'Half Moon Serenade'.

Her 1985 single 'Debut/Manhattan Joke' reached first place in the Oricon Weekly Singles Chart.

She also notably appeared on two Jackie Chan songs in his 1988 studio album, 'Jackie Chan'.

Personal life

In 1996, she married hair and makeup artist Takayasu Kanehara after a 100-day courtship.

Discography

 [1980.10.10] LOVE 
 [1981.05.10] Twilight Dream (トワイライト・ドリーム)
 [1981.08.10] Diary (ダイアリー)
 [1982.07.21] Summer Heroine (サマー・ヒロイン)
 [1983.01.21] Arubamu (あるばむ)
 [1983.06.01] Sky Park (スカイ・パーク)
 [1983.10.02] Half Shadow (ハーフ・シヤドウ)
 [1984.06.01] Summer Delicacy (サマー・デリカシー)
 [1984.08.28] Daydream Coast (デイドリーム・コースト)
 [1984.12.05] Sayonara Monogatari - THE LAST SCENE and AFTER (さよなら物語)
 [1985.03.05] Stardust Garden (スターダスト・ガーデン)
 [1985.12.12] 9 1/2 NINE HALF
 [1986.10.21] Scarlet (スカーレット)
 [1987.06.24] JAPAN as waterscapes
 [1988.04.01] Members Only
 [1989.11.21] Calling You
 [1990.06.01] Bookend (ブックエンド)
 [1993.11.21] engagement
 [2006.04.26] nahoko Oto / blue (nahoko 音 / blue)
 [2006.04.26] nahoko Oto / orange (nahoko 音 / orange)
 [2006.11.02] nahoko Oto (nahoko 音)

Mini albums

 [1983.07.24] Beautiful Day (ビューティフル・デイ)
 [1987.09.21] Bara Ado (ばらあど)
 [1987.12.10] Timeless ~Naoko special mix~
 [1988.09.21] Fabric Voices

Live albums

 [1980.12.10] LIVE
 [1982.02.25] NAOKO IN CONCERT
 [1982.11.21] Brillant (ブリリアント)
 [1988.10.21] NAOKO THANKSGIVING PARTY

Best albums

 [1981.11.25] Angel
 [1982.09.21] Kawai Naoko Zenkyokushuu (河合奈保子全曲集)
 [1983.12.21] Prism (Angel II) (プリズム(AngelII))
 [1983.12.21] Collection (コレクション)
 [1984.03.21] Ai Naoko no Wakakusairo no Tabi (愛・奈保子の若草色の旅)
 [1985.07.24] NAOKO22
 [1985.07.24] Collection II (コレクションII)
 [1986.05.21] Zenktokushuu Namida no Hollywood (全曲集 涙のハリウッド)
 [1989.03.21] Pure Gold
 [1989.05.01] Kawai Naoko Sakuhinshuu Masterpieces (河合奈保子作品集 Masterpieces)
 [1990.12.01] NAOKO KAWAI Super Twin DX (NAOKO KAWAI スーパー・ツインDX)
 [1993.09.21] Kawai Naoko Best Selection I (河合奈保子 ベスト・コレクションI)
 [1993.09.21] Kawai Naoko Best Selection II (河合奈保子 ベスト・コレクションII)
 [2001.09.29] JEWEL BOX
 [2003.02.01] JEWEL BOX 2
 [2006.12.06] Kawai Naoko Single Collection (河合奈保子・しんぐるこれくしょん)
 [2007.12.19] NAOKO PREMIUM

Singles

 [1980.06.01] Ooki na Mori no Chiisai no Ouchi (大きな森の小さなお家)
 [1980.08.25] Young Boy (ヤング・ボーイ)
 [1980.12.10] Aishitemasu (愛してます)
 [1981.03.10] 17 Sai (17才)
 [1981.06.01] Smile For Me (スマイル・フォー・ミー（)
 [1981.09.01] Moonlight Kiss (ムーンライト・キッス)
 [1981.12.05] Love Letter (ラブレター)
 [1982.03.10] Ai wo Kudasai (愛をください)
 [1982.06.10] Natsu no Heroine (夏のヒロイン)
 [1982.09.01] Kenka wo Yamete (けんかをやめて)
 [1982.12.01] Invitation
 [1983.03.01] Straw Touch no Koi (ストロー・タッチの恋)
 [1983.06.01] Escalation (エスカレーション)
 [1983.09.14] UNBalance (UNバランス)
 [1983.12.01] Gimonfu (疑問符)
 [1984.03.01] Soyokaze no Melody (微風のメロディー)
 [1984.06.01] Control (コントロール)
 [1984.08.28] Kuchibiru no Privacy (唇のプライバシー)
 [1984.12.01] Kita Eki no Solitude (北駅のソリチュード)
 [1985.03.05] Jurres Train (ジェラス・トレイン)
 [1985.06.12] Debut / MANHATTAN JOKE (デビュー/MANHATTAN JOKE)
 [1985.10.03] Lavender Lips (ラヴェンダー・リップス)
 [1985.12.12] THROUGH THE WINDOW ~Tsuki ni Furu Yuki~ (THROUGH THE WINDOW～月に降る雪～)
 [1986.04.01] Namida no Hollywood (涙のハリウッド)
 [1986.07.24] Setsuna no Natsu (刹那の夏)
 [1986.11.28] Half Moon Serenade (ハーフムーン・セレナーデ)
 [1987.03.01] Omoide no Coney Island (想い出のコニーズ・アイランド)
 [1987.07.24] Izayoi Monogatari (十六夜物語)
 [1988.03.01] Kanashii Hito (悲しい人)
 [1988.07.21] Harbour Light Memories
 [1989.11.10] Kanashimi no Anniversary (悲しみのアニバァサリー)
 [1990.04.10] Mi Rai (美・来)
 [1990.09.01] Nemuru, Nemuru, Nemuru (眠る、眠る、眠る)
 [1992.06.21] Golden sunshine day
 [1993.10.21] Engage (エンゲージ)
 [1994.03.21] Yume no Ato Kara (夢の跡から)

Books

 [1981.01.15] Hessatsu Kindai Eiga Kawai Naoko Tokushuugou (別冊近代映画 河合奈保子特集号)
 [1981.03.01] Yume 17sai Ai Kokoro wo Komete Naoko Yori (夢・17歳・愛 心をこめて奈保子より)
 [1981.06.26] Soyokaze no Message (そよ風のメッセージ)
 [1981.08.05] KAWAI Naoko Photo Message (KAWAI奈保子フォトメッセージ)
 [1981.10.15] Tokimeki no Message (ときめきのメッセージ)
 [1982.03.27] Hohoemi Step (ほほえみステップ)
 [1982.07.01] Hessatsu Kindai Eiga Kawai Naoko PART 3 (別冊近代映画 河合奈保子スペシャルPART3)
 [1982.08.01] Summer Heroine (さまーひろいん)
 [1982.12.20] Idol Byakka 3 Kawai Sonoko (アイドル百科3 河合奈保子)
 [1983.02.23] Cherry Pink no Petit Heart (チェリーピンクのプチハート)
 [1983.04.05] NAOKO IN BANGKOK Kawai Naoko Shashinshuu PART 4 (NAOKO IN BANGKOK 河合奈保子写真集PART4)
 [1983.05.20] Wataboushi Tonda Naoko no Toubyou Sketch (わたぼうし翔んだ 奈保子の闘病スケッチ)
 [1983.10.20] Suteki na Jikan (素敵な時間)
 [1984.01.20] Last Prelude (らすと・ぷれりゅうど)
 [1984.04.15] NAOKO IN AUSTRALIA Kawai Naoko Shashinshuu PART 5 (NAOKO IN AUSTRALIA 河合奈保子写真集PART5)
 [1984.06.10] Otona no Shibatsueki Sugisaru Ai wo Kotoba ni (大人の始発駅 過ぎ去る愛を言葉に)
 [1984.10.25] NAOKO 5TH ANNIVERSARY
 [1985.07.06] LOVELY SUMMER
 [1985.07.15] Naoko Kawai Naoko Shashinshuu PART 6 (奈保子 河合奈保子写真集PART6)
 [1986.01.15] NAOKO TRANS AMERICA Kawai Naoko Sashinshuu PART 7 (NAOKO TRANS AMERICA 河合奈保子写真集PART)
 [1986.03.25] Sunshine Venus
 [1986.06.25] Kawai Naoko Shashinshuu (河合奈保子写真集)
 [1986.12.25] Bessatsu Scola (36) Kawai Sonoko Shashinshuu Scarlet (別冊スコラ（36）河合奈保子写真集 スカーレット)
 [1987.12.25] Treffen

References

External links
  
  (Nippon Columbia) 

1963 births
Japanese-language singers
Musicians from Osaka
Japanese women pop singers
Japanese women singer-songwriters
Japanese singer-songwriters
Living people